Grafenwalder is a private brand beer sold at Lidl supermarkets. It has four known products, Grafenwalder Pilsner, Grafenwalder Spezial, Grafenwalder Hefe-Weißbier and Grafenwalder Strong. It is usually sold in plastic bottles, cans or 5l mini kegs.  It is made by Lindenbrauerei in Unna, owned by the Oetker Group and by Frankfurter Brauhaus in Frankfurt (Oder).

History

See also
Beer in Germany

References
 Lindenbrauerei Unna (Oetker Group) (ratebeer.com)

Specific

External links
 Lidl Online

Beer brands of Germany